Isoisänsilta (Swedish: Farfarsbron) is a pedestrian and cycling bridge in Helsinki, Finland, opened in June 2016.

The bridge connects the Kalasatama neighbourhood on the Helsinki mainland to the island of Mustikkamaa and, via it, to the islands of Korkeasaari and Kulosaari.

Conversely, at the Mustikkamaa end, the arch splits into two supports on either side of the central bridge deck.

The bridge was designed by the civil engineering firm Pontek, and is based on their winning entry, titled Tiikerihai ("Tiger Shark"), into the design contest held by the City of Helsinki in 2011. Construction began in 2014 and was completed in 2016, with the bridge opening to traffic on 1 June 2016.

The bridge is named after the Isoisänniemi promontory of Mustikkamaa, and its name literally translates as "Grandfather's Bridge".

In 2017, the Finnish Association of Civil Engineers chose Isoisänsilta as the 'Bridge of the Year'.

See also
Mustikkamaa
Kalasatama

References

Buildings and structures in Helsinki
Bridges in Finland
Bridges completed in 2016